The second season of Next Top Model by Cătălin Botezatu premiered on September 15, 2011.

All judging panel members were present for season two, with the exception of photographer Gabriel Hennessey. In contrast to the previous season, the number of contestants was increased from 12 to 16.

The winner of the competition was 14-year-old Laura Giurcanu from Bucharest.

The international destinations this season were Reykjavík, Istanbul, and Tunis.

Cast

Contestants
(Ages stated are at start of contest)

Judges
Cătălin Botezatu - Host
Laurent Tourette - Hair stylist
Liviu Ionescu - MRA Models
Mirela Vescan - Makeup artist

Episodes

Episode 1
First aired September 15, 2011

The judges welcome aspiring models to castings held all over Romania. The final fifteen are selected, and a surprise contestant (Sandra) is re-introduced to the competition despite not having made the final cut.

Episode 2First aired September 22, 2011

The models receive their makeovers. Gina and Laura throw a fit when they become displeased with their new looks. Later, the girls receive training on all things top model. This includes walking on an extremely narrow platform where the contestants must practice balance for the upcoming runway challenge.

At the runway challenge, the girls walk in a fashion show  wearing dresses designed by Mihai Albu. Mădălina Barbu (runner-up of the first season) was there to encourage them. The next day, the models take part in their very first photo shoot. The goal is to display their new looks. Iasmina is driven to the hospital that same day when she becomes ill. However, she does show up for the shoot despite her condition. Most girls do extremely well, with the exception of Miruna, Flori, Gina, Sandra and Iasmina - who struggle during their session.

At elimination, the girls are evaluated on their overall performance during the week. Sandra's photo receives heavy criticism, as does Miruna's and Iasmina's. Mădălina becomes faint at panel, is quickly carried away for medical attention. Ultimately, Flori, Miruna and Iasmina land in the bottom three. Flori is given another chance, resulting in the elimination of the former two.

First Call-out: Aida Becheanu
Bottom Three: Flori Ciupu, Iasmina Balamat & Miruna Iovan
Eliminated: Iasmina Balamat & Miruna Iovan
Featured photographer: Dragoș Trăistaru

Episode 3
First aired September 29, 2011

First Call-out: Gina Tănasie 
Bottom Two: Flori Ciupu & Mădălina Goian
Eliminated: Mădălina Goian

Episode 4
First aired October 6, 2011

First Call-out: Laura Giurcanu
Bottom Two: Cristina Chiriac & Irina Batrac
Eliminated: Cristina Chiriac

Episode 5
First aired October 13, 2011

First Call-out: Irina Batrac
Bottom Two: Denisa Hîncu & Gina Tănasie 
Eliminated: Denisa Hîncu

Episode 6
First aired October 20, 2011

First Call-out: Irina Batrac
Bottom Two: Gina Tănasie & Iulia  Micloș
Eliminated: Gina Tănasie

Episode 7
First aired October 27, 2011

First Call-out: Karin Arz
Bottom Three: Flori Ciupu, Iulia Micloș & Simona Din
Eliminated: None

Episode 8
First aired November 3, 2011

First Call-out: Sandra Ciubotariu
Bottom Three: Aida Becheanu, Iulia Micloș & Simona Din
Eliminated: Aida Becheanu & Simona Din

Episode 9
First aired November 10, 2011

First Call-out: Karin Arz
Bottom Two: Flori Ciupu & Iulia Micloș
Eliminated: Flori Ciupu

Episode 10
First aired November 17, 2011

First Call-out:  Karin Arz
Bottom Two: Iulia Micloș & Iuliana Mînza
Eliminated: Iulia Micloș

Episode 11
First aired November 24, 2011

First Call-out:  Karin Arz
Bottom Two: Diana Trofin & Iuliana Mînza 
Eliminated: Diana Trofin

Episode 12
First aired December 1, 2011

First Call-out: Karin Arz
Bottom Two: Irina Batrac & Iuliana Mînza
Eliminated: Irina Batrac

Episode 13
First aired December 8, 2011

First Call-out: Iuliana Mînza
Bottom Two: Karin Arz & Laura Giurcanu
Eliminated: None

Episode 14
First aired December 15, 2011

First Call-out: Laura Giurcanu
Bottom Two: Karin Arz & Sandra Ciubotariu
Eliminated: Karin Arz

Episode 15
First aired December 22, 2011

First Eliminated: Sandra Ciubotariu
Final Two: Iuliana Mînza & Laura Giurcanu    
Romania's Next Top Model: Laura Giurcanu

Results

 The contestant was eliminated
 The contestant was part of a non-elimination bottom four
 The contestant won the competition

 In episode 1, Sandra was added later as a surprise finalist after having been rejected during the last round of casting.
 In episode 2, Miruna, Iasmina, and Flori landed in the bottom three. Cătălin handed the last photograph to Flori, eliminating Miruna and Iasmina. 
In episode 7, Iulia, Flori, and Simona landed in the bottom three. None of them were eliminated.
 In episode 8, Simona, Aida, and Iulia landed in the bottom three. Cătălin handed the last photograph to Iulia, eliminating Aida and Simona.
In episode 13, Laura and Karin landed in the bottom two. Neither of them was eliminated.

Photo shoots
Episode 2 : Different Biracial Identity On A Team,Moslem Hijab Fashion In Cover Shoot
Episode 3 : Editorial Wizard Fashion
Episode 4 : Four Personality With Horse In Compcard (Badas,Innocent,Elegant,Romantic)
Episode 5 : Tropical Punch Summer Beauties
Episode 6 : High Fashion Cover Magazine With Body Painting In Individual And Pairs
Episode 7 : Anarchist Girl In The Party
Episode 8 : Swimwear Cover Battle Wear In Beach And In Jungle Waterfall At Thailand
Episode 9 : Queen's Of Dani Tribe 
Episode 10 : Endemic Primata In Wild And Nude At Borneo Jungle
Episode 11 : High Fashion In Traditional Folktales,Indonesian Ethnical Photo
Episode 12 : Glamorous Couture In Sumba
Episode 13 : Balinese Culture,Adventureous And Wildest In Batur Mount Volcanoes
Episode 14 : Indonesia's Tourism Commercial, Special Music Video With Traditional Song
Episode 15 : Queen Fashion Of The Nature (Labuan Bajo,Toba,Minang),Cover Magazine

References

External links
 Official website
 Laura for fashion model directory
 Laura at Models.com and MRA models

Romania
Romanian television series
Antena 1 (Romania) original programming